Sofronovo may refer to:

Sofronovo, Melenkovsky District, Vladimir Oblast, Russia
Sofronovo, Nikolsky District, Vologda Oblast, Russia
Sofronovo, Vashkinsky District, Vologda Oblast, Russia